Presidential elections were held in Pakistan on 4 September 2018. The elections saw Arif Alvi of PTI being elected as the 13th President of Pakistan after defeating Fazal-ur-Rehman of MMA and Aitzaz Ahsan of PPP. Although the incumbent President Mamnoon Hussain, whose term was to expire on 9th September 2018, was eligible for re-election, he declined to take part.

The PTI-led government coalition nominated a founding member of the party Arif Alvi, right after a week of the announcement of the official victory of PTI in the general elections. The PPP on the other hand took a solo flight in announcing the candidature of PPP stalwart, a law expert and a veteran politician Aitzaz Ashan without having done the consensus with the remaining opposition. Against PTI's Alvi and PPP's Ahsan, the PML-N-led  Opposition came up with Fazal-ur-Rehman, the leader of Far-right Islamist MMA, as their joint candidate. 

The Elections witnessed a decisive victory for Arif Alvi who managed to get 352 votes from the Electoral College. Opposition's Fazal-ur-Rehman followed with 184 votes, while Aitzaz Ahsan got only 124 votes. Alvi managed to emerge victorious in Punjab, KPK, and Balochistan, as well as the Parliament. Meanwhile, Aitzaz Ahsan was triumphant in Sindh. Although having a higher vote count than Ahsan, Fazal-ur-Rehman wasn't able to win in the Parliament or any Provincial Assembly.

The President-elect Arif Alvi was sworn in as the 13th President of Pakistan on 9th September 2018.

Schedule
The Election Commission of Pakistan announced the initial election schedule on 16 August 2018. Polling was conducted on following five places on 4 September 2018:

 Parliament House at Islamabad
 Punjab Provincial Assembly at Lahore
 Sindh Provincial Assembly at Karachi
 KPK Provincial Assembly at Peshawar
 Baluchistan Provincial Assembly at Quetta

Members of Senate and National Assembly cast their vote at Parliament House whereas members of Provincial Assemblies cast their vote at respective assemblies.

Electoral system
The President of Pakistan is indirectly elected by the Electoral College of Pakistan – a joint sitting of the Senate, National Assembly and Provincial Assemblies.

The votes of the members of the Senate and National Assembly are counted as single votes. Meanwhile, the votes given by the provincial assembly legislators are adjusted so as to give each province an equal share in the election. This is so because, each provincial assembly has a varying number of members, depending upon population size. The largest province by population size, Punjab, has a total of 371 members in its assembly, whereas the smallest province of Balochistan has a mere 65 members in its legislature. Therefore, the provincial votes are weighted against the Balochistan assembly in the following manner:

Regarding timing, the constitution states that election to the office of President must be held no earlier than sixty days and no later than thirty days before the expiration of the term of the incumbent president. If assemblies are not present, the constitution allows the election of president to be delayed thirty days after the general election.

The electoral process itself is done via a secret ballot due to the post of the president being constitutionally non-partisan. Therefore, unlike during the election of the Prime Minister, cross-party voting is not liable to be considered defection.

Electoral College
The Electoral College of Pakistan is formed by a joint sitting of the six leading political bodies in Pakistan:
 the Senate of Pakistan,
 the National Assembly of Pakistan,
 the Provincial Assembly of the Punjab,
 the Provincial Assembly of Sindh,
 the Provincial Assembly of Balochistan and
 the Provincial Assembly of Khyber Paktunkhwa

The maximum strength of the electoral college is 706. However, considering the vacant seats, the electoral college for this presidential election stood at 679. A simple majority is required in a two-candidate contest to claim victory. But in a three-candidate race, the victory requirement goes down considerably depending on how the votes are split.

The weighted votes of each political party in the six bodies constituting the electoral college are as follows:

Voting
The voting started at around 10:00 am PST. Prime Minister Imran Khan came to the Parliament House and cast his vote with an hour left in the voting deadline. The voting ended at 04:00 pm PST. A total of 1,110 votes were cast during the election out of which 28 votes were declared invalid.

Results

|-
! style="background-color:#E9E9E9;text-align:left;vertical-align:top;" |Candidate
! style="background-color:#E9E9E9;text-align:left;vertical-align:top;" |Main supporting party 
! style="background-color:#E9E9E9;text-align:center;" |Parliament
! style="background-color:#E9E9E9;text-align:center;" |Punjab
! style="background-color:#E9E9E9;text-align:center;" |Sindh
! style="background-color:#E9E9E9;text-align:center;" |Balochistan
! style="background-color:#E9E9E9;text-align:center;" |KP
! style="background-color:#E9E9E9;text-align:center;" |Total
|-
| style="text-align:left;" | Arif Alvi
| style="text-align:left;" | Pakistan Tehreek-e-Insaf
| style="text-align:right;" | 212
| style="text-align:right;" | 33
| style="text-align:right;" | 22
| style="text-align:right;" | 45
| style="text-align:right;" | 40
| style="text-align:right;" | 352
|-
| style="text-align:left;" | Fazal-ur-Rehman
| style="text-align:left;" | Pakistan Muslim League (N)
| style="text-align:right;" | 131
 | style="text-align:right;" | 25
 | style="text-align:right;" | 0
 | style="text-align:right;" | 15
 | style="text-align:right;" | 13
 | style="text-align:right;" | 184
|-
| style="text-align:left;" | Aitzaz Ahsan
| style="text-align:left;" | Pakistan Peoples Party
| style="text-align:right;" | 81
 | style="text-align:right;" | 1
 | style="text-align:right;" | 39
 | style="text-align:right;" | 0
 | style="text-align:right;" | 3
 | style="text-align:right;" | 124
|}

Candidates

Confirmed
Arif Alvi: Pakistan Tehreek-e-Insaf member of the National Assembly from NA-247 (Karachi South-II). Nominated by Prime Minister Imran Khan on 18 August 2018.
Aitzaz Ahsan: Pakistan Peoples Party former member of the Senate from Punjab. Nominated by Asif Ali Zardari on 19 August 2018.
Fazal-ur-Rehman: Joint Candidate of Muttahida Majlis-e-Amal, Pakistan Muslim League (N) and various other opposition parties. Nominated by Shahbaz Sharif on 27 August 2018.

Withdrawn
Amir Muqam: President of Pakistan Muslim League (N) in Khyber Pakhtunkhwa and former MNA. Withdrew his nomination papers following the joint nomination of Fazal-ur-Rehman.

Notes

References

2018 elections in Pakistan
2018
September 2018 events in Pakistan